Gorenje is a major appliance manufacturer from Slovenia. It can also refer to:

Places in Slovenia
 Gorenje, Kočevje
 Gorenje, Lukovica
 Gorenje, Postojna
 Gorenje, Spodnje Koseze
 Gorenje, Velenje
 Dozens of places starting with Gorenje ("Upper"), see

Other
 Gorenje Dialog, a microcomputer system